The 15th Pan American Games were held in Rio de Janeiro, Brazil, between 13 July 2007 and 29 July 2007.

Medals

Bronze

woman's High Jump: Levern Spencer

See also
Saint Lucia at the 2008 Summer Olympics

External links
Rio 2007 Official website

Nations at the 2007 Pan American Games
2007
Pan American Games